Yamunamai (Nepali: यमुनामाई) is a rural municipality in Rautahat District, a part of Province No. 2 in Nepal. It was formed in 2016 occupying current 5 sections (wards) from previous 5 former VDCs. It occupies an area of 16.70 km2 with a total population of 23,884.

References 

Populated places in Rautahat District
Rural municipalities of Nepal established in 2017
Rural municipalities in Madhesh Province